Garrett County Airport  is a public airport located 13 miles (21 km) northeast of the central business district (CBD) of Oakland, a town in Garrett County, Maryland, United States.

Facilities 

 Runway 9/27: 5,000 x 75 ft (1,524 x 23 m), surface: asphalt

External links 

 Garrett County Airport

References 

Airports in Maryland
Transportation buildings and structures in Garrett County, Maryland